The Presbytery of Amathole or Amatola is a presbytery of the Uniting Presbyterian Church in Southern Africa, based in Eastern Cape, South Africa. It stretches from Queenstown and Bedford through to East London and includes Alice and Stutterheim.

References

Presbyteries and classes